Honi HaMe'agel (חוני המעגל Khoni, Choni, or Ḥoni; lit. Honi the Circle-drawer) was a Jewish scholar of the 1st-century BCE, during the age of the tannaim, the scholars from whose teachings the Mishnah was derived.

During the 1st century BCE, a variety of religious movements and splinter groups developed amongst the Jews in Judea. A number of individuals claimed to be miracle workers in the tradition of Elijah and Elisha, the ancient Jewish prophets. The Babylonian Talmud, and the Jerusalem Talmud both provide some examples of such Jewish miracle workers, including Honi.

Circle drawing incident 

His surname is derived from an incident in which, according to the Babylonian Talmud, his prayer for rain was miraculously answered. On one occasion, when God did not send rain well into the winter (in Israel, it rains mainly in the winter), Honi drew a circle in the dust, stood inside it, and informed God that he would not move until it rained. When it began to drizzle, Honi told God that he was not satisfied and expected more rain; it then began to pour. He explained that he wanted a calm rain, at which point the rain calmed to a normal rain.

He was almost put into herem (excommunication) for the above incident in which he showed "dishonor" to God, as if he had imposed himself upon God. However, Shimon ben Shetach, the brother of Queen Shlomtzion, excused him, saying that Honi had a special relationship with God.

Two variations of this story appear in the Talmud, in Taanit 19a and 23a.

Extended sleep story 

Two variations of a story are recorded—in the Babylonian and Jerusalem Talmuds—in which Honi fell asleep for decades before awaking. The story provides a Jewish version on the theme of a person or persons (as the Seven Sleepers) sleeping for many decades and waking to find a changed world—a theme originating in the story of Epimenides—found in many divergent cultures and traditions, and in modern times associated especially with the Rip Van Winkle story.

In the Babylonian Talmud (Carob tree story)
The Babylonian Talmud tells the following story, in which Honi slept for 70 years, before awaking and then dying: 

The lesson that is taken away from this story is that if you give something you will not be alive to see, you are still giving.

In the Jerusalem Talmud 
In the Jerusalem Talmud, the circle drawing story is notably missing (except in the Mishnah), and the sleep theme does not manifest as the carob tree story. Instead, the story is about Honi sleeping in a cave for seventy years, then returning to see that the Temple had been rebuilt, and where he was able to prove his identity:

Unlike the Babylonian Talmud story, the account in the Jerusalem Talmud does not describe Honi's death. This more closely resembles the Epimenides sleep story in which Epimenides is able to pass on his message. According to one source, this difference could be specifically because of the two pieces this story is based on: Honi's death in Josephus (described below), and the Epimenides sleep theme. The idea would be that in the Jerusalem Talmud's case, the author more closely followed the Epimenides story to get their point across, while in the Babylonian Talmud, the author had a more metaphorical approach to his death in Josephus. The story of Honi the Circle-Maker is also quoted in Midrash Tehillim, chapter 126.

Death 
According to Josephus, in Antiquities of the Jews, Honi met his end in the context of conflict between the Hasmonean brothers Hyrcanus II, backed by the Pharisees and advised by Antipater the Idumaean, and Aristobulus II, backed by the Sadducees. Around 63 BC, Honi was captured by the followers of Hyrcanus besieging Jerusalem and was asked to pray for the demise of their opponents. Honi, however, prayed: "Lord of the universe, as the besieged and the besiegers both belong to Your people, I beseech You not to answer the evil prayers of either." After this, the followers of Hyrcanus stoned him to death.

The Babylonian Talmud records a different story of his death, as part of the aforementioned carob tree story. The Maharsha explains the discrepancy between the Talmud and Josephus by stating that Honi was "presumed" killed by Hyrcanus II's men, but in reality was put into a deep sleep or coma for 70 years, and only then died.

Honi's grave is found near the town of Hatzor HaGlilit in northern Israel.

Explanation of the word HaMe'agel 

"HaMe'agel" in Hebrew means "circle maker". Samuel Klein suggested that the term "circle maker" relates to Honi's profession as a roofer (in Hebrew Me'agel).  It was customary for sages in the Talmud to be called by their profession. Rollers for compressing plaster and mud on roofs during the Hellenistic period were found at Mount Gerizim. In the time of Honi, these rollers are the tools of the trade for a me'agel/circle maker/roofer. The Mishna in Maakot 2:1 calls this roofer a "circle maker" ("me'agel"). The term circle maker has a double meaning - profession and a label to describe Honi's drawing circles to interact with God.

See also 
 Epimenides
 Line in the sand (phrase)
 Magic circle
 Rainmaking
 Rip Van Winkle
 Zisurrû

References 

Mishnah rabbis
1st-century BCE rabbis
Talmud rabbis of the Land of Israel
Sleep in mythology and folklore